State Highway Spur 536 (Spur 536) is a state highway spur in San Antonio, Texas.

Route description
Spur 536 begins at the intersection of US 281 and Loop 410; northbound US 281 follows Loop 410 to the east, while Spur 536 continues north along Roosevelt Avenue through the mission district of San Antonio. The route passes the west side of Stinson Municipal Airport before crossing Loop 13 (Military Drive). Spur 536 turns northwest onto Steves Avenue (crossing under I-10), then north onto Probandt Avenue through Southtown. It then turns west along Alamo Street before ending at I-10/35.

History
Spur 536 was designated on February 23, 1978, along with Spur 537, due to the rerouting of US 281 along the Interstate 37 freeway through central and south San Antonio. Spur 536 was proposed for decommissioning in 2014 as part of TxDOT's San Antonio turnback proposal, which would have turned back over 129 miles of roads to the city of San Antonio, but the city of San Antonio rejected that proposal.

Major intersections

See also
List of highways in San Antonio, Texas
List of state highway spurs in Texas

References

536
Transportation in Bexar County, Texas
Transportation in San Antonio
U.S. Route 281